Fantastic Voyage: Live Long Enough to Live Forever (Rodale Books) is a book authored by Ray Kurzweil and Terry Grossman published in 2004. The basic premise of the book is that if middle aged people can live long enough, until approximately 120 years, they will be able to live forever—as humanity overcomes all diseases and old age itself. This might also be considered a break-even scenario where developments made during a year increase life expectancy by more than one year. Biogerontologist Aubrey de Grey called this the "Longevity escape velocity" in a 2005 TED talk.

The book focuses primarily on health topics such as heart disease, cancer, and type 2 diabetes. It promotes lifestyle changes such as a low glycemic index diet, calorie restriction, exercise, drinking green tea and alkalinized water, and other changes to daily living. They also promote aggressive supplementation to make up for nutrient deficiencies they believe are common in Western society.  In contrast to his previous book The 10% Solution for a Healthy Life, in which he recommended a diet with 10% of calories from fat, in this book, Kurzweil recommends consuming less than one third of calories from carbohydrates (and less than one sixth of calories in his low-carbohydrate diet) and consuming 25% of calories from fat.

The book states that the purpose of these changes is to obtain and maintain idyllic health so that an individual can extend his or her life as long as possible. The authors believe that within the next 20 to 50 years technology will advance to the point where much of the aging process will be conquered, and degenerative diseases eliminated. The book is peppered with side notes on these futuristic topics, showing how current research is leading us toward life extension, and explaining how future technologies such as nanotechnology and bioengineering might change the way humans live their lives. Ray Kurzweil discusses these topics at further length in his 2005 book The Singularity Is Near.

A follow-up on Fantastic Voyage, Transcend: Nine Steps to Living Well Forever, was released on April 28, 2009.

Organization
Chapter 1: You can live long enough to live forever
Chapter 2: The bridges to come
Chapter 3: Our personal journeys
Chapter 4: Food and water
Chapter 5: Carbohydrates and the glycemic load
Chapter 6: Fat and protein
Chapter 7: You are what you digest
Chapter 8: Change your weight for life in one day
Chapter 9: The problem with sugar (and insulin)
Chapter 10: Ray's personal program
Chapter 11: The promise of genomics
Chapter 12: Inflammation—the latest "smoking gun"
Chapter 13: Methylation—critically important to your health
Chapter 14: Cleaning up the mess: Toxins and detoxification
Chapter 15: The real cause of heart disease and how to prevent it
Chapter 16: The prevention and early detection of cancer
Chapter 17: Terry's personal program
Chapter 18: Your brain: The power of thinking...and of ideas
Chapter 19: Hormones and aging, hormones of youth
Chapter 20: Other hormones of youth: Sex hormones
Chapter 21: Aggressive supplementation
Chapter 22: Keep moving: The power of exercise
Chapter 23: Stress and balance
Epilogue

Criticisms
One claim in the book has been called pseudoscientific. Dr. Stephen Lower, retired Professor of Chemistry at Simon Fraser University, disputes some of the book's statements about alkaline water, claiming that "Ionized water" is nothing more than sales fiction; the term is meaningless to chemists." Kurzweil and Grossman counter this specific criticism directly in their Reader Q&A.

See also
 Ending Aging
 Nutrition
 Simulated reality
 Technological singularity
 Millions Now Living Will Never Die

References

External links
 Fantastic-voyage.net
 Short Guide - lifestyle changes from the book in bullet point format
 Reader Q&A - response to criticism of alkaline water claim

Books by Ray Kurzweil

Medical books
Technology books
Biomedical engineering
Biogerontology
Books about life extension
Rodale, Inc. books
2004 non-fiction books